Ragnvald Olafsson or Rǫgnvaldr Óláfsson may refer to:

Ragnvald Heidumhære (fl. 9th century), possibly son of Olaf Geirstad-Alf, petty king of Vestfold
Rǫgnvaldr Óláfsson (fl. 1164), king of Mann and the Isles
Rǫgnvaldr Óláfsson (died 1249), king of Mann and the Isles

See also
Rogvolod, 10th-century prince of Polotsk